Information technology planning (ITP) is a discipline within the information technology and information systems. ITP makes the planning process for information technology investments and decision-making a quicker, more flexible, and a more thoroughly aligned process.  According to Architecture and Governance Magazine, (Strategic) ITP became an overarching discipline within the Strategic Planning domain in which enterprise architecture is now one of several capabilities.

Arguments in favor 

IT takes too long to adjust plans to meet business needs. By the time IT is prepared, opportunities have passed and the plans are obsolete. IT doesn't have the means to understand how it currently supports business strategy. The linkage between IT’s capabilities—and their associated costs,
benefits, and risks—and business needs is not mapped out. Additionally, information gathering and number crunching hold the process back.

IT makes plans that don’t reflect what IT will actually do or what the business actually needs. In the end, business doesn’t understand how IT contributes to the execution of strategy. IT doesn’t start planning with a clear picture of which demand is truly strategic or which actions will have the biggest impact. Information regarding business needs and the costs, benefits, and risks of IT capabilities comes from sources of varying quality. IT then makes planning decisions based on misleading information.

IT's plans often end up rigid and unverifiable. Plans don’t include contingencies that reduce the impact of change, nor have they been verified as the best plan of action via comparison to alternatives and scenarios. IT simply doesn’t have the time and information for it. Manually preparing multiple plans and selecting the best one would take too long for most organizations—especially considering the availability of the information needed for a comparison.

Strategies for providing an information technology planning capability 

According to Forrester Research, there are several recognized strategies for providing an information technology planning capability.

A repository of application data. Planning tools provide a common inventory of application data including costs, life cycles, and owners, so that planners have easy access to the information that drives their decisions.

Capability maps. Forrester recommends using capability maps to link IT's capabilities to the critical business processes they support. These software tools provide a graphical tool that clearly outlines how the business capabilities that IT provides to the business are linked to IT’s efforts. This can also be known as an IT Road-map or technology roadmap.

Gap analysis tools. Alongside capability maps, planning tools capture information about the future state of business capabilities as dictated by business strategy. Users leverage this functionality to identify the areas where IT capabilities need to be built, enhanced, or scaled back—driving IT’s strategy.

Modeling and analytic capability. These tools enable planning teams to create a variety of plans, which can then be compared to one another to weigh the pros, cons, and risks of each. In addition, their impact on architecture and current initiatives becomes visible. This keeps plans relevant, provides teams with the foresight to plan holistically, and enables IT to communicate the plan clearly.

Reporting tools. Reports guide the planning team’s decisions—for example, which applications have redundant capabilities, have not been upgraded, or are plagued with costly issues. IT’s strategic decisions are therefore more easily justified.
The management process are used in business policy and each person are able to promote the policy of data feeds and how much process are able to know the process is built up in each and every process of management data.

Results 

Companies like Barclays Bank, Accenture and Vodafone as well as Government agencies like Department of Homeland Security and Los Alamos National Laboratory, have made investments in strategic IT planning capabilities and returns on investment as great as 700% have been validated for these kinds of projects.

See also
 Requirement prioritization
 Strategic management
 Strategic technology plan
 Technology roadmap

References

External links
Forrester Research, Tools for IT Planning
The 2008 A&G Reader Survey: The Rise of Strategic IT Planning and Executive Involvement, Architecture & Governance Magazine
The Forrester Wave: Business Process Analysis, EA Tools, And IT Planning, Q1 2009
Strategic IT Planning Comes of Age, April 2009, Architecture & Governance Magazine

Information technology management